Panic Button is a 1964 low-budget Italian-produced comedy film starring, Maurice Chevalier, Eleanor Parker, Jayne Mansfield, and Mike Connors. Filmed in the summer of 1962, in Italy, and released nearly two years later, the film tells the story of how a washed-up actor (Chevalier) and a buxom unknown (Mansfield) are chosen to co-star in a television production of Romeo and Juliet. The picture is known for being one of several foreign films Mansfield was forced to make after her contract was dropped from 20th Century Fox in 1962.

Cast
 Maurice Chevalier as Philippe Fontaine
 Eleanor Parker as Louise Harris
 Jayne Mansfield as Angela
 Mike Connors as Frank Pagano (billed as: Michael Connors)
 Akim Tamiroff as Pandowski
 Carlo Croccolo as Guido

Releases
The film was opened to a brief release in Italy in 1962, and was officially released in the United States in April 1964. At most theaters, Panic Button served as a secondary feature and not a success.

External links
 

1964 films
Films directed by George Sherman
Films directed by Giuliano Carnimeo
Italian comedy films
1964 comedy films
1960s Italian-language films
English-language Italian films
1960s English-language films
1960s multilingual films
Italian multilingual films
1960s Italian films